Kushneria pakistanensis is a Gram-negative, moderately halophilic, rod-shaped and motile  bacterium from the genus of Kushneria which has been isolated from the rhizosphere of the grass Saccharum spontaneum from the Karak district in Pakistan.

References

Oceanospirillales
Bacteria described in 2015